The 1958–59 National Hurling League was the 28th season of the NHL, an annual hurling competition for the GAA county teams.  won the title.

Division 1

Division 1A

Group stage

Division 1B

Group stage

Final

Top scorers

Top scorers overall

Top scorers in a single game

Division 2

Group 2A table

Group 2B table

Knock-out stage

Final

References

National Hurling League seasons
Lea
Lea